Templeton Emerging Markets Investment Trust (TEMIT) (SEDOL 0882929, ISIN GB0008829292) is a large global emerging markets investment trust. It is listed on the London Stock Exchange and is a constituent of the FTSE 250 Index. The investment management is conducted by the UK subsidiary of Franklin Templeton Investments, Franklin Templeton Investment Management Limited.

References

External links 

Investment trusts of the United Kingdom